Alla Petrovna Tsuper (born 16 April 1979) is a Ukrainian (until 2000) and Belarusian (since 2000) aerial skier.

Career
She was 5th at the 1998 Winter Olympics (representing Ukraine), 9th at the 2002 Winter Olympics, 10th at the 2006 Winter Olympics, and 8th at the 2010 Winter Olympics after reaching the finals of the event by coming first in the qualifying round. At the 2014 Winter Olympics, she finally became the Olympic champion by performing a fairly well executed back full-full-full (three backflips with three twists) while in the super final.

After the 2010 Winter Olympics Tsuper retired from freestyle skiing and had a baby. She returned to competitive freestyle skiing two years later.

In Final 2 of the 2014 Olympics, Tsuper finished in the last qualifying position, 0.03 point ahead of the next athlete. In the super final, she flawlessly demonstrated a new jump, whereas all three other competitors fell. Tsuper was trained by Nikolay Kozeko, who, in particular, convinced her to return to competitions in 2012.

References

External links

 Profile on fis-ski.com

1979 births
Living people
Ukrainian female freestyle skiers
Belarusian female freestyle skiers
Freestyle skiers at the 1998 Winter Olympics
Freestyle skiers at the 2002 Winter Olympics
Freestyle skiers at the 2006 Winter Olympics
Freestyle skiers at the 2010 Winter Olympics
Freestyle skiers at the 2014 Winter Olympics
Freestyle skiers at the 2018 Winter Olympics
Olympic freestyle skiers of Belarus
Olympic freestyle skiers of Ukraine
Medalists at the 2014 Winter Olympics
Olympic gold medalists for Belarus
Olympic medalists in freestyle skiing
Sportspeople from Rivne
Ukrainian emigrants to Belarus
Naturalized citizens of Belarus